Eticlopride is a selective dopamine antagonist that acts on D2 dopamine receptor. It is primarily used in pharmacological research.

References

External links 

Benzamides
Chloroarenes
D2 antagonists
Phenol ethers
Pyrrolidines